The 22nd Annual Latin Grammy Awards was held on Thursday, November 18, 2021, at the MGM Grand Garden Arena, Las Vegas to honour the best musical releases within Latin music released from June 1, 2020, to May 31, 2021. The nominations were announced on September 28, 2021. The ceremony was air live on Univision.

In June 2021, Panamanian musician Rubén Blades was named Person of the Year by the Latin Recording Academy, unlike last year where the main ceremony took place in a normal way but the Person of the Year award was not given nor did the ceremony for the award took place due to the COVID-19 pandemic, this year's ceremony for the award took place on November 17, 2021, the day before the main ceremony as it usually does.

Singers and musicians Martinho da Vila, Emmanuel, Pete Escovedo, Sheila E., Fito Páez, Milly Quezada, Joaquín Sabina and Gilberto Santa Rosa received the Lifetime Achievement Award while Mexican producer Guillermo "Memo" Acosta and Colombian accordionist Egidio Cuadrado are this year's recipients of the Trustees Award.

Performances

 Note: C. Tangana performed alongside artists such as Natalia Lafourcade, Nathy Peluso, Jorge Drexler, La Húngara, Alizzz, among others.

Presenters 
Bella Thorne and Silvestre Dangond – presented Best Traditional Pop Vocal Album
Evaluna Montaner and Ricardo Montaner – introduced Camilo
Kimberly Dos Ramos and Joss Favela – presented Best Norteño Album
María Becerra and Fito Páez – presented Best Pop Vocal Album
Sofia Carson and Jorge Soler – presented Best Urban Music Album
Milly Quezada – introduced Juan Luis Guerra 4.40
Sofia Reyes and Eladio Carrión – presented Best Reggaeton Performance
Ángela Aguilar and Matteo Bocelli – presented Best New Artist
Gloria Estefan – introduced Yotuel, Gente De Zona, Descemer Bueno, Maykel Osorbo, El Funky
Livia Brito and Emmanuel – presented Record of the Year
Jorge Drexler and Natalia Lafourcade – presented Song of the Year
Pepe Aguilar – presented Album of the Year

Winners and nominees
The nominations were announced on September 28, 2021.

General
Record of the Year
"Talvez" – Caetano Veloso and Tom Veloso

Mário Adnet & Cézar Mendes, record producers; Lucas Ariel & Lucas Nunes, recording engineers; Daniel Carvalho, mixer; Daniel Carvalho, mastering engineer
 "Si Hubieras Querido" – Pablo Alborán
 Julio Reyes Copello, record producer; Pablo Pulido, Julio Reyes Copello & Natalia Schlesinger, recording engineers; Nicolás Ramírez, mixer; Gene Grimaldi, mastering engineer
 "Todo de Ti" – Rauw Alejandro
 Rauw Alejandro & Luis J. González, record producers; José M. Collazo, recording engineer; José M. Collazo, mixer; Sensei Sound, mastering engineer 
 "Un Amor Eterno (Versión Balada)" – Marc Anthony
 Motiff & Julio Reyes Copello, record producers; Nicolás “Na’vi” De La Espriella, Julio Reyes Copello & Daniel Uribe, recording engineers; Nicolás Ramírez & Julio Reyes Copello, mixers; Gene Grimaldi, mastering engineer  
 "A Tu Lado" – Paula Arenas
 Maria Elisa Ayerbe & Sebastián Mejía, record producers; Maria Elisa Ayerbe & Sebastián Mejía, recording engineers; Maria Elisa Ayerbe, mixer; Camilo Silva, mastering engineer
 "Bohemio" – Andrés Calamaro & Julio Iglesias
 Carlos Narea, record producer; Ángel Martos & Carlos Narea, mixers; Ángel Martos, mastering engineer
 "Vida de Rico" – Camilo
 Édgar Barrera & Camilo, record producers; Édgar Barrera, Richard Bravo & Nicolás Ramírez, recording engineers; Luis Barrera Jr., mixer; Mike Bozzi, mastering engineer
 "Suéltame, Bogotá" – Diamante Eléctrico
 Juan Galeano & Andrés Rebellón, record producers; Diamante Eléctrico & Andrés Rebellón, recording engineers; Andrés Rebellón, mixer; Gavin Lurssen, mastering engineer
 "Amén" – Ricardo Montaner, Mau y Ricky, Camilo, Evaluna Montaner
 Richi López & Ricardo Montaner, record producers; Richi López, Aaron Sterling & Guillermo Vadalá, recording engineers; Manny Marroquin, mixer; Michelle Mancini, mastering engineer
 "Dios Así lo Quiso" – Ricardo Montaner & Juan Luis Guerra
 David "Xaxo" Julca, Jonathan "Xaxo" Julca, Yasmil Marrufo & Ricardo Montaner, record producers; Luis Alejandro Bermúdez, Allan Leschhorn, Yasmil Marrufo, Dario Moscatelli, Raniero Palm & Ruben Salas, recording engineers; Javier Garza, mixer; Mike Fuller, mastering engineer
 "Te Olvidaste" – C. Tangana & Omar Apollo
 Alizzz, Rafa Arcaute, C. Tangana & Federico Vindver, record producers; Rafa Arcaute, Nathan Phillips & Federico Vindver, recording engineers; Delbert Bowers, mixer; Chris Athens, mastering engineer

Album of the Year
SALSWING! – Rubén Blades and Roberto Delgado & Orquesta

Roberto Delgado, album producer; Oscar Marín, album recording engineer; Roberto Delgado & Oscar Marín, album mixers; Rubén Blades, songwriter; Daniel Ovie, album mastering engineer
 Vértigo – Pablo Alborán
 Pablo Alborán & Julio Reyes Copello, album producers; Pablo Pulido, Julio Reyes Copello & Natalia Schlesinger, album recording engineers; Nicolás Ramírez, album mixer; Pablo Alborán, songwriter; Gene Grimaldi, album mastering engineer
 Mis Amores – Paula Arenas
 Maria Elisa Ayerbe, Sebastián Mejía & Julio Reyes Copello, album producers; Maria Elisa Ayerbe, Sebastián Mejía & Julio Reyes Copello, album recording engineers; Maria Elisa Ayerbe & Julio Reyes Copello, album mixers; Paula Arenas, María Elisa Ayerbe, Kany García, Fernando Osorio, Julio Reyes Copello & Juan Pablo Vega, songwriters; Camilo Silva, album mastering engineer
 El Último Tour Del Mundo – Bad Bunny
 Mag & Tainy, album producers; Josh Gudwin, album mixer; Bad Bunny, Mag & Tainy, songwriters; Colin Leonard, album mastering engineer
 Mis Manos – Camilo
 Édgar Barrera & Camilo, album producers; Natalia Ramírez & Nicolás Ramírez, album recording engineers; Maddox Chhim, album mixer; Édgar Barrera & Camilo, songwriters; Mike Bozzi, album mastering engineer
 Nana, Tom, Vinicius – Nana Caymmi
 Dori Caymmi, album producer; Mario Jorge Bruno, Mario Gil, Kira Malevskaia & Gabriel Teixeira, album recording engineers; Mario Gil, album mixer; Vinicius de Moraes & Tom Jobim, songwriters; Mario Gil, album mastering engineer
 Privé – Juan Luis Guerra
 Juan Luis Guerra & Janina Rosado, album producers; Allan Leschhorn, album recording engineer; Allan Leschhorn, album mixer; Juan Luis Guerra, songwriter; Adam Ayan, album mastering engineer
 Origen – Juanes
 Juanes & Sebastian Krys, album producers; Said Edid, Daniel Galindo, Juanes, Sebastian Krys & Pepe Ortega, album recording engineers; Sebastian Krys, album mixer; Brian Lucey, album mastering engineer
 Un Canto por México, Vol. 2 – Natalia Lafourcade
 Kiko Campos, album producer; José Luis Fernández, Rubén López Arista, Alan Ortiz Grande & Alan Saucedo, album recording engineers; Rubén López Arista, album mixer; Michael Fuller, album mastering engineer
 El Madrileño – C. Tangana
 Alizzz, Victor Martínez & C. Tangana, album producers; Alizzz, album recording engineer; Delbert Bowers, album mixer; Alizzz, Victor Martínez & C. Tangana, songwriters; Chris Athens, album mastering engineer

Song of the Year
"Patria y Vida" – Yotuel, Gente De Zona, Descemer Bueno, Maykel Osorbo, El Funky

Descemer Bueno, El Funky, Gente De Zona, Yadam González, Beatriz Luengo, Maykel Osorbo & Yotuel, songwriters
 "A Tu Lado" – Paula Arenas
 Paula Arenas & Maria Elisa Ayerbe, songwriters (Paula Arenas)
 "A Veces" – Diamante Eléctrico
 Diamante Eléctrico, songwriters
 "Agua" – Tainy & J Balvin
 J Balvin, Alejandro Borrero, Jhay Cortez, Kevyn Mauricio Cruz Moreno, Derek Drymon, Mark Harrison, Stephen Hillenburg, Alejandro Ramirez, Ivanni Rodríguez, Blaise Smith, Tainy & Juan Camilo Vargas, songwriters
 "Canción Bonita" – Carlos Vives & Ricky Martin
 Rafa Arcaute, Ricky Martin, Mauricio Rengifo, Andrés Torres & Carlos Vives, songwriters
 "Dios Así lo Quiso" – Ricardo Montaner & Juan Luis Guerra
 Camilo, David Julca, Jonathan Julca, Yasmil Jesús Marrufo & Ricardo Montaner, songwriters
 "Hawái" – Maluma
 Édgar Barrera, René Cano, Kevyn Cruz, Johan Espinosa, Kevin Jiménez, Miky La Sensa, Bryan Lezcano, Maluma, Andrés Uribe & Juan Camilo Vargas, songwriters 
 "Mi Guitarra" – Javier Limón, Juan Luis Guerra & Nella
 Javier Limón, songwriter
 "Que Se Sepa Nuestro Amor" – Mon Laferte & Alejandro Fernández
 El David Aguilar & Mon Laferte, songwriters
 "Si Hubieras Querido" – Pablo Alborán
 Pablo Alborán, Nicolás “Na’vi” De La Espriella, Diana Fuentes & Julio Reyes Copello, songwriters
 "Todo de Ti" – Rauw Alejandro
 Rauw Alejandro, José M. Collazo, Luis J. González, Rafael E. Pabón Navedo & Eric Pérez Rovira, songwriters
 "Vida de Rico" – Camilo
 Édgar Barrera & Camilo, songwriters

Best New Artist
Juliana Velásquez
 Giulia Be
 María Becerra
 Bizarrap
 Boza
 Zoe Gotusso
 Humbe
 Rita Indiana
 Lasso
 Paloma Mami
 Marco Mares

Pop
Best Pop Vocal Album
Mis Manos – Camilo Dios los Cría – Andrés Calamaro
 Munay – Pedro Capó
 K.O. – Danna Paola
 De México – Reik

Best Traditional Pop Vocal AlbumPrivé – Juan Luis Guerra Vértigo – Pablo Alborán
 Mis Amores – Paula Arenas
 Doce Margaritas – Nella
 Atlántico a Pie – Diego Torres

Best Pop Song"Vida de Rico" – CamiloÉdgar Barrera & Camilo, songwriters "Adiós" – Sebastián Yatra
 David Julca, Jonathan Julca, Pablo López & Sebastián Yatra, songwriters 
 "Ahí" – Nella
 Javier Limón, songwriter 
 "Canción Bonita" – Carlos Vives & Ricky Martin
 Rafa Arcaute, Ricky Martin, Mauricio Rengifo, Andrés Torres & Carlos Vives, songwriters 
 "La Mujer" – Mon Laferte & Gloria Trevi
 Mon Laferte, songwriter

Urban
Best Urban Fusion/Performance"Tattoo (Remix)" – Rauw Alejandro & Camilo "El Amor es una Moda" – Alcover, Juan Magán & Don Omar
 "Nathy Peluso: Bzrp Music Sessions, Vol. 36" – Bizarrap & Nathy Peluso
 "Diplomatico" – Major Lazer featuring Guaynaa
 "Hawái (Remix)" – Maluma & The Weeknd

Best Reggaeton Performance"Bichota" – Karol G "Tu Veneno" – J Balvin
 "La Tóxica" – Farruko
 "Caramelo" – Ozuna
 "La Curiosidad" – Jay Wheeler, DJ Nelson & Myke Towers

Best Urban Music AlbumEl Último Tour Del Mundo – Bad Bunny Goldo Funky – Akapellah
 Monarca – Eladio Carrión
 ENOC – Ozuna
 Lyke Mike – Myke Towers

Best Rap/Hip Hop Song"Booker T" – Bad BunnyBad Bunny & Marco Daniel Borrero, songwriters  "Condenados" – Akapellah
 Akapellah & Pedro Querales, songwriters 
 "La Vendedora de Placer" – Lito MC Cassidy
 Lito MC Cassidy, songwriter
 "SANA SANA" – Nathy Peluso
 Rafa Arcaute, Gino Borri, Illmind, Ángel López, Nathy Peluso & Federico Vindver, songwriters 
 "Snow Tha Product: Bzrp Music Sessions, Vol. 39" – Bizarrap & Snow Tha Product
 Bizarrap & Snow Tha Product, songwriters

Best Urban Song"Patria y Vida" – Yotuel, Gente De Zona, Descemer Bueno, Maykel Osorbo, El FunkyDescemer Bueno, El Funky, Gente De Zona, Yadam González, Beatriz Luengo, Maykel Osorbo & Yotuel, songwriters "A Fuego" – Farina
 Farina, Joshua Javier Méndez, Sech, Jonathan Emmanuel Tobar & Jorge Valdés Vásquez, songwriters
 "Agua" – Tainy & J Balvin
 J Balvin, Alejandro Borrero, Jhay Cortez, Kevyn Mauricio Cruz Moreno, Derek Drymon, Mark Harrison, Stephen Hillenburg, Alejandro Ramírez, Ivanni Rodríguez, Blaise Smith, Tainy & Juan Camilo Vargas, songwriters
 "Dákiti" – Bad Bunny & Jhay Cortez
 Bad Bunny, Jhay Cortez, Nydia Laner, Gabriel Mora, Egbert Rosa & Tainy, songwriters 
 "La Curiosidad" – Jay Wheeler, DJ Nelson & Myke Towers
 Myke Towers & Jay Wheeler, songwriters

Rock
Best Rock AlbumEl Pozo Brillante – Vicentico Curso de Levitación Intensivo – Bunbury
 Control – Caramelos de Cianuro
 Los Mesoneros Live desde Pangea – Los Mesoneros
 Luz – No Te Va Gustar

Best Rock Song"Ahora 1" – VicenticoVicentico, songwriter "Distintos" – De La Tierra
 Andrés Giménez & Andreas Kisser, songwriters 
 "El Sur" – Love of Lesbian featuring Bunbury
 Santi Balmes & Julián Saldarriaga, songwriters 
 "Hice Todo Mal" – Las Ligas Menores
 Anabella Cartolano, songwriter 
 "Venganza" – No Te Va Gustar & Nicki Nicole
 Emiliano Brancciari & Nicki Nicole, songwriters

Best Pop/Rock AlbumOrigen – Juanes Mira Lo Que Me Hiciste Hacer – Diamante Eléctrico
 Mis Grandes Éxitos – Adan Jodorowsky & The French Kiss
 V. E. H. N. – Love of Lesbian
 El Reflejo – Rayos Laser

Best Pop/Rock Song"Hong Kong" – C. Tangana & Andrés CalamaroAlizzz, Andrés Calamaro, Jorge Drexler, Víctor Martínez & C. Tangana, songwriters "A Veces" – Diamante Eléctrico
 Diamante Eléctrico, songwriters 
 "Cosmos (Antisistema Solar)" – Love of Lesbian
 Santi Balmes & Julián Saldarriaga, songwriters 
 "El Duelo" – Zoé
 Sergio Eduardo Acosta & León Larregui, songwriters 
 "Ganas" – Zoe Gotusso
 Zoe Gotusso, Nicolás Landa & Diego Mema, songwriters

Alternative
Best Alternative Music AlbumCalambre – Nathy Peluso KiCk i – Arca
 Tropiplop – Aterciopelados
 Cabra – Cabra
 Un Segundo MTV Unplugged – Café Tacvba

Best Alternative Song"Nominao" – C. Tangana & Jorge DrexlerAlizzz, Jorge Drexler & C. Tangana, songwriters 
 "AGARRATE" – Nathy Peluso
 Rafa Arcaute, Pedro Campos & Nathy Peluso, songwriters
 "Antidiva" – Aterciopelados
 Andrea Echeverri, songwriter
 "Confía" – Gepe & Vicentico
 Gepe, songwriter
 "Te Olvidaste" – C. Tangana & Omar Apollo
 Omar Apollo, Rafa Arcaute, C. Tangana & Federico Vindver, songwriters

Tropical
Best Salsa AlbumSALSA PLUS! – Rubén Blades and Roberto Delgado & Orquesta En Cuarentena – El Gran Combo de Puerto Rico
 El Día es Hoy – Willy García
 Colegas – Gilberto Santa Rosa
 En Barranquilla Me Quedo, El Disco Homenaje a Joe Arroyo (Varios Artistas) – José Gaviria & Milton Salcedo, album producers

Best Cumbia/Vallenato AlbumLas Locuras Mías – Silvestre Dangond Pa' Que se Esmigajen los Parlantes – Diego Daza & Carlos Rueda
 De Buenos Aires para el Mundo – Los Ángeles Azules
 Esencia – Felipe Peláez
 Noche de Serenata – Osmar Pérez & Geño Gamez

Best Merengue/Bachata AlbumEs Merengue ¿Algún  Problema? – Sergio Vargas Bachata Queen – Alexandra
 Love Dance Merengue – Manny Cruz
 El Papá de la Bachata, Su Legado (Añoñado I, II, III, IV) – Luis Segura
 Insensatez – Fernando Villalona

Best Traditional Tropical AlbumCha Cha Chá: Homenaje a lo Tradicional – Alain Pérez, Issac Delgado and Orquesta Aragón Gente con Alma – José Aguirre Cali Big Band
 Chabuco en La Habana – Chabuco
 Solos – Jon Secada & Gonzalo Rubalcaba
 Alma Cubana – Leoni Torres

Best Contemporany Tropical/Tropical Fusion AlbumBrazil305 – Gloria Estefan Legendarios – Billos
 Río Abajo – Diana Burco
 Acertijos – Pedrito Martínez
 La Música del Carnaval - XX Aniversario – Juventino Ojito y Su Son Mocaná

Best Tropical Song"Dios Así lo Quiso" – Ricardo Montaner & Juan Luis GuerraCamilo, David Julca, Jonathan Julca, Yasmil Marrufo & Ricardo Montaner, songwriters "Bolero a la Vida" – Omara Portuondo featuring Gaby Moreno
 Santiago Larramendi & Gaby Moreno, songwriters
 "Más Feliz Que Ayer" – Chabuco
 Alfredo Nodarse, songwriter
 "Pambiche de Novia" – Juan Luis Guerra
 Juan Luis Guerra, songwriter
 "Un Suemo Increíble (Homenaje a Jairo Varela)" – Dayhan Díaz and Charlie Cardona
 Jorge Luis Piloto, songwriter

Songwriter
Best Singer-Songwriter AlbumSEIS – Mon Laferte Alemorología – AleMor
 Mendó – Alex Cuba
 Mañana Te Escribo Otra Canción – Covi Quintana 
 El Árbol y el Bosque – Rozalén

Regional Mexican
Best Ranchero/Mariachi AlbumA Mis 80's – Vicente Fernández Cuanto te Enamores – El Bebeto
 #CHARRAMILLENNIAL - LADY – Nora González
 AYAYAY! (SÚPER DELUXE) – Christian Nodal
 Soy México – Pike Romero

Best Banda AlbumNos Divertimos Logrando lo Imposible – Grupo Firme Concierto Mundial Digital Live – Banda El Recodo de Cruz Lizárraga
 Vivir la Vida – Banda Los Recoditos
 Sin Miedo al Éxito – Banda Los Sebastianes
 Llegando al Rancho – Joss Favela

Best Tejano AlbumPa' la Pista y Pa'l Pisto, Vol. 2 – El Plan Back on Track – Ram Herrera
 Histórico – La Fiebre
 Incomparable – Sólido
 Un Beso es Suficiente – Vilax

Best Norteño AlbumAl Estilo Rancherón – Los Dos Carnales (tie)Volando Alto – Palomo (tie)
 Vamos Bien – Calibre 50
 De Vieja Escuela – Gera Demara
 Diez – La Energía Norteña
 Recordando a una Leyenda – Los Plebes del Rancho de Ariel Camacho, Christian Nodal

Best Regional Song"Aquí Abajo" – Christian NodalEdgar Barrera, René Humberto Lau Ibarra & Christian Nodal, songwriters "Cicatrices" – Nora González with Lupita Infante
 Pepe Portilla, songwriter
 "40 y 21" – Beto Zapata
 Erika Vidrio, songwriter
 "Que Se Sepa Nuestro Amor" – Mon Laferte & Alejandro Fernández
 El David Aguilar & Mon Laferte, songwriters
 "Tuyo y Mío" – Camilo & Los Dos Carnales
 Édgar Barrera, Camilo & Alfonso de Jesús Quezada Mancha, songwriters

Instrumental
Best Instrumental AlbumToquinho e Yamandu Costa - Bachianinha (Live at Rio Montreaux Jazz Festival) – Toquinho and Yamandu Costa Entretiempo y Tiempo – Omar Acosta and Sergio Menem
 Cristovão Bastos e Rogério Caetano – Cristovão Bastos and Rogério Caetano
 Canto da Praya - Ao Vivo – Hamilton de Holanda and Mestrinho
 Le Petit Garage (Live) – Ara Malikian

Traditional
Best Folk AlbumAncestras – Petrona Martinez Amor Pasado – Leonel García
 Jemas – Tato Marenco
 Renacer – Nahuel Pennisi
 Vocal – Alejandro Zavala

Best Tango AlbumTinto Tango Plays Piazzolla – Tinto Tango Tango of the Americas – Pan American Symphony Orchestra
 348 – Federico Pereiro
 100 Años – Quinteto Revolucionario
 Tanghetto Plays Piazzolla – Tanghetto

Best Flamenco AlbumUn Nuevo Universo – Pepe de Lucía Alma de Pura Raza – Paco Candela
 Amor – Israel Fernández & Diego Del Morao
 Herencia – Rafael Riqueni
 El Rey – María Toledo

Jazz
Best Latin Jazz/Jazz AlbumVoyager – Iván Melon Lewis Bruma: Celebrating Milton Nascimiento – Antonio Adolfo
 Ontology – Roxana Amed 
 Family – Edmar Castañeda
 El Arte del Bolero – Miguel Zenón & Luis Perdomo

Christian
Best Christian Album (Spanish Language)Ya Me Vi – Aroddy Hora Dorada – Anagrace
 Redención – Aline Barros
 Vida Encontré – Majo y Dan
 Milagro de Amar – William Perdomo

Best Christian Album (Portuguese Language)Seguir Teu Coração – Anderson Freire Catarse: Lado B – Daniela Araújo
 Sarah Farias (Ao Vivo) – Sarah Farias
 Sentido – Leonardo Gonçalves
 Eli Soares 10 Anos – Eli Soares

 Portuguese Language 
Best Portuguese Language Contemporary Pop AlbumCor – Anavitória A Bolha – Vitor Kley
 Duda Beat & Nando Reis – Nando Reis & Duda Beat
 Será que Você Vai Acreditar? – Fernanda Takai
 Chegamos Sozinhos em Casa Vol1 – Tuyo

Best Portuguese Language Rock or Alternative AlbumÁlbum Rosa – A Cor do Som Emidoinã – André Abujamra
 OxeAxeExu – BaianaSystem
 Assim Tocam Meus Tambores – Marcelo D2
 Fôlego – Scalene
 O Bar Me Chama – Velhas Virgens

Best Samba/Pagode AlbumSempre Se Pode Sonhar – Paulinho da Viola Rio: Só Vendo a Vista – Martinho da Vila
 Nei Lopes, Projeto Coisa Fina e Guga Stroeter no Pagode Black Tie – Nei Lopes, Projeto Coisa Fina and Guga Stroeter
 Samba de Verão – Diogo Nogueira
 Onze (Músicas Inéditas de Adoniran Barbosa) (Vários Artistas) – Lucas Mayer, producer

Best MPB (Musica Popular Brasileira) AlbumCanções D'Além Mar – Zeca Baleiro H.O.J.E – Delia Fischer
 Tempo de Viver – Thiago Holanda
 Bom Mesmo é Estar Debaixo D'Água – Luedji Luna
 Do Meu Coração Nu – Zé Manoel

Best Sertaneja Music AlbumTempo de Romance – Chitãozinho & Xororó Daniel em Casa – Daniel 
 Patroas – Marília Mendonça, Maiara & Maraísa
 Conquistas – Os Barões da Pisadinha
 Pra Ouvir no Fone – Michel Teló

Best Portuguese Language Roots AlbumArraía da Veveta – Ivete Sangalo Sambadeiras – Luiz Caldas
 Do Coração – Sara Correia
 Orin a Língua dos Anjos – Orquestra Afrosinfônica; André Magalhães & Ubiratan Marques, album producers
 Eu e Vocês – Elba Ramalho

Best Portuguese Language Song"Lisboa" – Anavitória and LenineAna Caetano & Paulo Novaes, songwriters "A Cidade" – Chico Chico and João Mantuano
 Jõão Pedro de Araújo Silva, Pedro Fonseca da Costa Silva, Marcos Mesmo, Francisco Ribeiro Eller, Luiz Ungarelli & Lucas Videla, songwriters
 "Amores e Flores" – Melim
 Diogo Melim & Rodrigo Melim, songwriters
 "Espera a Primavera" – Nando Reis
 Nando Reis, songwriter
 "Lágrimas de Alegria" – Maneva & Natiruts
 Tales De Polli & Deko, songwriters
 "Mulheres Não Têm Que Chorar" – Ivete Sangalo & Emicida
 Tiê Castro, Emicida & Guga Fernandes, songwriters

Children's
Best Latin Children’s AlbumTu Rockcito Filármonico – Tu Rockcito and Orquesta Filarmónica de Medellín Otra Vuelta al Sol – Cantoalegre; Edith Derdyk, Daniel Escobar, Luis Fernando Franco, Jesús David Garcés, Fito Hernández, Paulo Tatit & José Julián Villa, album producers
 Danilo & Chapis, Vol. 1 – Danilo & Chapis
 Canciones de Cuna – Mi Casa Es Tu Casa
 Nanas Consentidoras – Victoria Sur

Classical
Best Classical AlbumLatin American Classics – Kristhyan BenitezJon Feidner, album producer Beethoven: Révolution, Symphonies 1 à 5 – Jordi Savall & Le Concert des Nations
 Jordi Savall, conductor; Manuel Mohino, album producer
 Claudio Santoro: A Obra Integral Para Violoncelo e Piano – Ney Fialkow & Hugo Pilger
 Maria de Fátima Nunes Pilger & Hugo Pilger, album producers
 Music from Cuba and Spain, Sierra: Sonata para Guitarra – Manuel Barrueco
 Asgerdur Sigurdardottir, album producer
 Tres Historias Concertantes – Héctor Infanzón
 Konstantin Dobroykov, conductor; Héctor Infanzón, album producer

Best Classical Contemporary Composition"Music from Cuba and Spain, Sierra: Sonata para Guitarra" – Manuel BarruecoRoberto Sierra, composer "Concierto para Violín y Orquesta-Remembranzas" – Héctor Infanzón & William Harvey
 Héctor Infanzón, composer
 "Cuatro" – Orlando Jacinto Garcia featuring Amernet String Quartet
 Orlando Jacinto García, composer
 "Desde la Tierra que Habito" – Ensamble Contemporáneo Universitario (ECU) & Banda de Conciertos de Cartago (BCC)
 Eddie Mora, composer
 "Falling Out of Time" – Osvaldo Golijov
 Osvaldo Golijov, composer

Arrangement
Best Arrangement"Ojalá que Llueva Café (Versión Privé)" – Juan Luis GuerraJuan Luis Guerra, arranger "Blue in Green (Sky and Sea)" – Roxana Amed
 Kendall Moore, arranger
 "Tierra Mestiza" – America Viva Band
 César Orozco, arranger
 "Adiós Nonino" – Jorge Calandrelli
 Jorge Calandrelli, arranger
 "Um Beijo" – Melody Gardot
 Vince Mendoza, arranger

Recording Package
Best Recording PackageColegas – Gilberto Santa RosaAna Gonzalez, art director Lo Que Me Dé La Gana – Dani Martín
 Boa Mistura, art director
 Madrid Nuclear – Leiva
 Emilio Lorente, art director
 Puta – Zahara
 Emilio Lorente, art director
 Tragas o Escupes – Jarabe de Palo
 Marc Donés, art director

Production
Best Engineered AlbumEl Madrileño – C. TanganaOrlando Aispuro Meneses, Daniel Alanís, Alizzz, Rafa Arcaute, Josdán Luis Cohimbra Acosta, Miguel De La Vega, Máximo Espinosa Rosell, Alex Ferrer, Luis Garcié, Billy Garedella, Patrick Liotard, Ed Maverick, Beto Mendonça, Jaime Navarro, Alberto Pérez, Nathan Phillips, Harto Rodríguez & Federico Vindver, engineers; Delbert Bowers, Alex Ferrer, Jaycen Joshua, Nineteen85, Lewis Pickett, Alex Psaroudakis & Raül Refree, mixers; Chris Athens, mastering engineer bpm – Salvador Sobral
 Nelson Carvalho, engineer; Leo Aldrey & Rafael Giner, mixers; Tiago De Sousa, mastering engineer
 Bruma: Celebrating Milton Nascimiento – Antonio Adolfo
 Roger Freret, engineer; Claudio Spiewak, mixer; André Dias, mastering engineer
 Iceberg – Priscila Tossan
 Mauro Araújo, engineer; Andre Kassin, mixer; Carlos Freitas, mastering engineer
 Un Canto por México, Vol. 2 – Natalia Lafourcade
 Pepe Aguilar, Rodrigo Cuevas, José Luis Fernández, Camilo Froideval, Edson R. Heredia, Manu Jalil, Rubén López Arista, Nacho Molino, David Montuy, Lucas Nunes, Alan Ortiz Grande & Alan Saucedo, engineers; Rubén López Arista, mixer; Michael Fuller, mastering engineer

Producer of the Year Edgar Barrera "Botella tras botella" (Christian Nodal & Gera MX) (S) "100 Años" (Carlos Rivera & Maluma) (S) "De Vuelta Pa' la Vuelta" (Daddy Yankee & Marc Anthony) (S) Mis Manos (Camilo) (A) "Pa Ti" (Jennifer Lopez & Maluma) (S) "Poco" (Reik & Christian Nodal) (S) #7DJ (7 Días en Jamaica) (Maluma) (A) "Vida de Rico" (Camilo) (S) Alizzz
 El Madrileño (C. Tangana) (A)
 Bizarrap
 "Zaramay: Bzrp Music Sessions, Vol. 31" (Bizarrap & Zaramay) (S)
 "Cazzu: Bzrp Music Sessions, Vol. 32" (Bizarrap & Cazzu) (S)
 "Khea: Bzrp Music Sessions, Vol. 34" (Bizarrap & Khea) (S)
 "Nathy Peluso: Bzrp Music Sessions, Vol. 36" (Bizarrap & Nathy Peluso) (S)
 "Ysy A: Bzrp Music Sessions, Vol. 37" (Bizarrap & Ysy A) (S)
 "L-Gante: Bzrp Music Sessions, Vol. 38" (Bizarrap & L-Gante) (S)
 Marcos Sánchez
 Amor y Punto (Manolo Ramos) (A)
 Dan Warner
 Blanco (Tracks: 1, 2, 4, 6, 10, 11 & 14) (Ricardo Arjona) (A)

Music video
Best Short Form Music Video"Un Amor Eterno" – Marc AnthonyCarlos R. Pérez, video director; Maricel Zambrano, video producer "Reza Forte" – BaianaSystem featuring BNegão
 Belle De Melo, video director; Marcelo Cintra, video producer
 "Mi Huella" – Fuel Fandango featuring María José Llergo
 Alex Gargot, video director; Alberto Tortes Catelló, video producer
 "Visceral" – Fran, Carlos Do Complexo & Bibi Caetano
 Pedro Alvarenga, video director; Marcos Araújo & Bernardo Portella, video producers
 "De Una Vez" – Selena Gomez
 Los Perez, video director; Kim Dellara & Clark Jackson, video producers

Best Long Form Music VideoEntre Mar y Palmeras'' – Juan Luis Guerra

Jean Guerra, video director; Nelson Albareda, Amarilys Germán, Jean Guerra & Edgar Martínez, video producers
 Un Segundo MTV Unplugged – Café Tacvba
 Miguel Roldán, video director; Antonio Contreras Moya, video producer
 Mulher – Carolina Deslandes
 Filipe Correia Dos Santos, video director; Pedro Caldeirão, video producer
 Origen (Documental) – Juanes
 Kacho López Mari, video director; María Tristana Robles Reyes, video producer
 Quien Me Tañe Escucha Mis Voces (Documental)'' – Gastón Lafourcade
 Bruno Bancalari, video director; Natalia Lafourcade & Juan Pablo López Fonseca, video producers

Special Awards
Person of the Year
 Rubén Blades

Lifetime Achievement Award
 Martinho da Vila
 Emmanuel
 Pete Escovedo
 Sheila E.
 Fito Páez
 Milly Quezada
 Joaquín Sabina
 Gilberto Santa Rosa

Trustees Award
 Guillermo "Memo" Acosta
 Egidio Cuadrado

References

External links
The Latin Recording Academy Official Site

2021 in Latin music
2021 music awards
2021
November 2021 events in the United States
MGM Grand Garden Arena